Francesco Mattuteia (25 January 1897 – 7 March 1981) was an Italian association football manager and footballer who played as a forward. On 23 November 1924, he represented the Italy national football team on the occasion of a friendly match against Germany in a 1–0 away win.

References

1897 births
1981 deaths
Italian footballers
Italy international footballers
Association football forwards
F.C. Pro Vercelli 1892 players
Piacenza Calcio 1919 players
Novara F.C. players
A.C.N. Siena 1904 players
People from Santhià